"I Just Want to See His Face" is a song by English rock band the Rolling Stones featured on their 1972 release Exile on Main St.  It is credited to Mick Jagger and Keith Richards.

Background 
In 1992, Jagger commented:

Reception
Music reviewer Bill Janovitz writes, "‘I Just Want to See His Face’ has the band exploring the music of America, specifically the country, blues, folk, and soul of the South... [it] sounds ancient and from another planet; a swampy, stompy gospel song that was recorded to intentionally sound as if it is a field recording document of a long-ago church basement revival meeting." The song's bluesy, murky atmosphere has drawn admiration from other artists.  Singer/songwriter Tom Waits names it as one of his favorite recordings: "That song had a big impact on me, particularly learning how to sing in that high falsetto, the way Jagger does. When he sings like a girl, I go crazy," Waits says. "This is just a tree of life. This record is the watering hole."

Recording
The gospel elements to some songs on Exile have been attributed to the presence of Billy Preston during the final recording sessions in Los Angeles. Preston would take Jagger to Sunday services. Initial recording took place in 1970 at Olympic Studios, with overdubs added in early 1972 at Sunset Sound Studios. With Jagger on lead vocals, Keith Richards on electric piano, Mick Taylor plays electric bass and Bill Plummer contributes upright bass. Charlie Watts performs drums with producer Jimmy Miller providing percussion. Clydie King, Venetta Fields, Jerry Kirkland perform the backing vocals for the track.

Bobby Whitlock claims he played the electric piano on the track in a Facebook post dated July 14, 2019. He describes the song development:

On the video, Whitlock shows his part on a 1950's Wurlitzer electric piano, stating:

CoCo Carmel Whitlock, wife of Bobby Whitlock, states in an 2019 Email to the website owner of www.timeisonourside.com

References

The Rolling Stones songs
1972 songs
Songs written by Jagger–Richards
Song recordings produced by Jimmy Miller